At-Tanʿīm is a neighbourhood of Makkah in western Saudi Arabia. In this district is Masjid A'ishah, a boundary of the Ḥaram, where pilgrims of Ḥajj and ʿUmrah can put on Iḥram.

See also 
 List of cities and towns in Saudi Arabia
 Regions of Saudi Arabia

References

External links 

Populated places in Mecca Province